Otto Meyer (1901–1980) was an American film editor.

Meyer was born in San Francisco, began working as a film editor in 1931, and edited about 80 films and television shows through the 1960s.  He was nominated for the Academy Award for Best Film Editing twice, once for Theodora Goes Wild in 1936, and The Talk of the Town in 1942.

Filmography 
The Gambling Fool (1925)
Border Law (1931)
The Fighting Fool (1932)
Texas Cyclone (1932)
Two-Fisted Law (1932)
Silent Men (1933)
 Police Car 17 (1933)
Damaged Lives (1933)
 Before Midnight (1933)
 Hold the Press (1933)
 In Spite of Danger (1935)
 The Best Man Wins (1935)
Adventure in Manhattan (1936)
Theodora Goes Wild (1936)
Counsel for Crime (1937)
 Racketeers in Exile (1937)
 The Taming of the West (1939)
Music in My Heart (1940)
Penny Serenade (1941)
The Talk of the Town (1942)
The More the Merrier (1943)
My Kingdom for a Cook (1943)
Something to Shout About (1943)
 Ever Since Venus (1944)
 Nine Girls (1944)
 Louisiana Hayride (1944)
Face to Face (1952)

References

External links 
 

1901 births
1980 deaths
American film editors